Jonathan Myles (born July 24, 1982) is an American luger who competed from 1999 to 2006. He finished 18th in the men's singles event at the 2006 Winter Olympics in Turin. Myles best finish at the FIL World Luge Championships was 12th in the men's singles event at Nagano in 2004.

A native of Rumney, New Hampshire, Myles co-owned a landscaping business in Lake Placid, New York with fellow American luger Preston Griffall.

References
 2006 luge men's singles results
 FIL-Luge profile
 United States Olympic Committee profile

External links
 
 
 

1982 births
Living people
American male lugers
Olympic lugers of the United States
Lugers at the 2006 Winter Olympics
People from Lake Placid, New York
People from Rumney, New Hampshire